Richard Gland (September 17, 1933 – September 15, 1997) was an American professional wrestler who used the ring name Dick "Bulldog" Brower.

Professional wrestling career
Gland started his career in the Delaware territory in 1958 under the ring name the Delaware Destroyer. In 1961, Brower traveled to Canada to wrestle for Stu Hart in his wrestling promotion Stampede Wrestling. After his run in Stampede Wrestling, Brower wrestled for Frank Tunney in Toronto from 1961 to 1974. There, Brower won the NWA International Tag Team Championship (Toronto version) five times from 1962 to 1968. Also, he worked for American Wrestling Association, NWA St. Louis, Big Time Wrestling (Detroit) and All-Star Wrestling in Montreal. 

Then in 1966, Brower got a call from Vincent J. McMahon to be a heel in the World Wide Wrestling Federation (Northeast territory) where he feuded with WWWF Heavyweight Champion Bruno Sammartino where Brower headlined main events against Sammartino in 1966, 1969 and 1970. He also feuded with Pedro Morales who was WWWF Heavyweight Champion in 1971. Afterwards Brower left New York.     

Brower also wrestled for National Wrestling Federation (NWF), where he won the NWF North American Heavyweight Championship in 1970. Brower went on to wrestle for another wrestling promotion this time World Championship Wrestling (Australia) where he won the NWA Austra-Asian Heavyweight Championship in 1972 defeating Spiros Arion. He wrestled for the short-lived International Wrestling Association in the New York City area, where he was recognized as North American Champion, feuding with Johnny Powers and Mighty Igor.

After his run in the NWF, Brower return to the World Wide Wrestling Federation (WWWF) now called the World Wrestling Federation (WWF) in 1979. There, he was managed by Lou Albano. He left WWF in 1982. 

Brower then traveled to Puerto Rico, where he competed for the World Wrestling Council (WWC). In WWC, he won the NWA North American Tag Team Championship (Puerto Rico/WWC version).

He retired from professional wrestling in 1988. During his career Brower faced wrestlers such as Bruno Sammartino, Johnny Valentine, Mil Máscaras, Tiger Jeet Singh, Bob Backlund, Whipper Watson, The Sheik, The Fabulous Kangaroos, Johnny Powers, Spiros Arion, Bobby Duncum, Sr., and Ernie Ladd.

Personal life
Gland dropped out of chiropractic school to pursue a career as a professional wrestler. 

After living with diabetes, Gland died in September 1997 from complications from hip surgery. At the time of his death, Gland was divorced to Susan and had two daughters and a son, as well as four grandchildren.

Championships and accomplishments
International Wrestling Association
IWA North American Heavyweight Championship (1 time)
IWA Tag Team Championship (2 times) – with Mighty Igor (1) and Johnny Powers (1)
Maple Leaf Wrestling
NWA International Tag Team Championship (Toronto version) (5 times) – with Sweet Daddy Siki (1), Johnny Valentine (1), Dr.Jerry Graham (1), and Whipper Billy Watson (2)
National Wrestling Federation
NWF North American Heavyweight Championship (3 times)
NWF World Tag Team Championship (2 times) - with Mighty Igor (1) and Johnny Powers (1)
World Class Championship Wrestling
NWA American Tag Team Championship (1 time) – with Roddy Piper
World Championship Wrestling (Australia)
NWA Austra-Asian Heavyweight Championship (1 time)
World Brass Knuckles Championship
World Wrestling Council
NWA North American Tag Team Championship (Puerto Rico/WWC version) (1 time) – with Luke Graham

References

External links
 

1933 births
1997 deaths
American male professional wrestlers
Professional wrestlers from Delaware
Sportspeople from Wilmington, Delaware
Stampede Wrestling alumni
20th-century professional wrestlers
NWF North American Heavyweight Champions
NWF World Tag Team Champions
NWA International Tag Team Champions (Toronto version)
NWA Austra-Asian Heavyweight Champions
World Brass Knuckles Champions